Berk Demir (born May 18, 1995) is a Turkish professional basketball player who plays as power forward for Türk Telekom of the Turkish Basketbol Süper Ligi (BSL). He played college basketball at Istanbul Technical University.

College career
Demir began playing college basketball as early as age 16 during the 2011-12 season for the İTÜ B.K. at Istanbul Technical University. He played 13 games and averaged 2.4 points, 1.5 rebounds and 0.1 assists.

Professional career
Demir joined the Turkish Basketball League while still in his teens and played for the Anadolu Efes during the 2011-12 season. In his only game played with the team, Demir averaged 6.0 points, 8.0 rebounds and 1.0 blocks.

He returned to İTÜ B.K. in 2012 and played for the team in 106 games until 2016, averaging a combined total of 27.6 points, 17.1 rebounds and 2.3 assists.

In 2016, Demir returned to Anadolu Efes and played until 2018. He played 22 games and averaged a combined total of 2.6 points, 2.0 rebounds and 0.5 rebounds.

Demir entered the 2017 NBA Draft in which he was not selected.

In 2018, Demir signed with Darüşşafaka.

On June 12, 2021, he has signed with Türk Telekom of the Turkish Basketbol Süper Ligi (BSL).

References

External links
Berk Demir EuroCup Profile
Berk Demir TBLStat.net Profile
Berk Demir Eurobasket Profile
Berk Demir TBL Profile

Living people
1999 births
Anadolu Efes S.K. players
Darüşşafaka Basketbol players
Power forwards (basketball)
Basketball players from Istanbul
Turkish men's basketball players
Türk Telekom B.K. players